Arthur Michael Jaffe (born December 22, 1937) is an American mathematical physicist at Harvard University, where in 1985 he succeeded George Mackey as the Landon T. Clay Professor of Mathematics and Theoretical Science.

Education and career
After graduating from Pelham Memorial High School in 1955, Jaffe attended Princeton University as an undergraduate obtaining a degree in chemistry in 1959, and later Clare College, Cambridge, as a Marshall Scholar, obtaining a degree in mathematics in 1961. He then returned to Princeton, obtaining a doctorate in physics in 1966 with Arthur Wightman.  His whole career has been spent teaching mathematical physics and pursuing research at Harvard University. His 26 doctoral students include Joel Feldman, Ezra Getzler, and Clifford Taubes. He has had many post-doctoral collaborators, including , Konrad Osterwalder, Juerg Froehlich, Thomas Spencer, and Antti Kupiainen.

For several years Jaffe was president of the International Association of Mathematical Physics, and later of the American Mathematical Society.  He chaired the Council of Scientific Society Presidents. He presently serves as chair of the board of the Dublin Institute for Advanced Studies, School of Theoretical Physics.

Jaffe conceived the idea of the Clay Mathematics Institute and its programs, including the employment of research fellows and the Millennium Prizes in mathematics.  He served as a founding member, a founding member of the board, and the founding president of that organization.

Arthur Jaffe began as chief editor of Communications in Mathematical Physics in 1979 and served for 21 years until 2001. He is a distinguished visiting professor at the Academy of Mathematics and Systems Science of the Chinese Academy of Sciences.

Contributions
With James Glimm, he founded the subject called constructive quantum field theory.  They established existence theorems for two- and three-dimensional examples of non-linear, relativistic quantum fields.

Awards and honors
Awarded the Dannie Heineman Prize for Mathematical Physics in 1980. In 2012 he became a fellow of the American Mathematical Society.

Personal life
Jaffe was married from 1971 to 1992 to Nora Frances Crow and they had one daughter, Margaret Collins, born in 1986. Jaffe was married to artist Sarah Robbins Warren from 1992 to 2002.

References

External links
 Jaffe's website
 Mathematical Picture Language Project at Harvard University
 
 Dublin Institute for Advanced Study: Governing Boards 
  (lecture by Arthur Jaffe, 18 May 2016, Trinity College Dublin)
 
 
 List of Past AMS Presidents (Jaffe is the 54th.)

20th-century American mathematicians
1937 births
Members of the United States National Academy of Sciences
21st-century American mathematicians
Quantum physicists
Harvard University faculty
Princeton University alumni
Marshall Scholars
Living people
Fellows of the Society for Industrial and Applied Mathematics
Members of the Royal Irish Academy
Presidents of the American Mathematical Society
Fellows of the American Mathematical Society
Mathematical physicists
American physicists
Santa Fe Institute people
Fellows of the American Physical Society
Presidents of the International Association of Mathematical Physics
Academics of the Dublin Institute for Advanced Studies